Kylor Kelley (born August 26, 1997) is an American professional basketball player for the Raptors 905 of the NBA G League. He played college basketball for the Oregon State Beavers.

Early life and high school career
Kelley grew up playing basketball under the coaching of his mother, a former high school player. At age six or seven, he moved with his mother and brother from Utah to Oregon, after his parents split. Kelley played three years of varsity basketball for Gervais High School in Gervais, Oregon. While attending Gervais, he grew from 6'1 to 7'0 but did not weigh more than 185 pounds. As a senior, Kelley averaged 15.9 points, 12.4 rebounds, 7.8 blocks and 2.4 assists per game and was named PacWest Player of the Year. He set the school's career, single-season and single-game records for blocks. Kelley did not qualify to play for most four-year colleges. As a result, he had no NCAA Division I offers out of high school.

College career
Kelley began playing college basketball for Bushnell University. As a freshman, Kelley averaged 8.6 points, 8.8 rebounds and 5.6 blocks per game and set a school single-game record with 10 blocks against Southern Oregon. After 10 games, he was dismissed from Bushnell. Kelley transferred to Lane Community College, where he received more Division I interest as a result. In his sophomore season, he averaged 9.9 points, 7.5 rebounds and 4.6 blocks per game and was a Northwest Athletic Conference All-Defensive Team selection.

At Lane CC, Kelley was recruited by multiple Pac-12 programs and chose to continue his career at Oregon State because he wanted to stay close to home. On December 17, 2018, as a junior at Oregon State, Kelley tallied a school-record nine blocks, to go with 10 points and nine rebounds, in an 82–67 victory over Pepperdine. By the end of the season, he ranked second in the nation, led the Pac-12 and set a school record with 3.35 blocks per game. He also averaged 7.7 points and five rebounds per game and was named to the Pac-12 All-Defensive Team. On December 18, 2019, as a senior, Kelley posted a season-high 23 points, six rebounds and three blocks in an 88–78 win over UTSA. He became Oregon State's all-time leader in blocks in a January 30, 2020 victory over Stanford, during which he posted 10 points, seven blocks and six rebounds. Kelley finished his senior season averaging 11.1 points, 5.3 rebounds and 3.45 blocks per game, earning Pac-12 All-Defensive Team honors for a second time. He averaged the second-most blocks per game in the nation and led the Pac-12 in that category. Despite the Pac-12 Tournament being cancelled due to the coronavirus pandemic, Kelley finished with 211 blocks in two years at Oregon State.

Professional career

Austin Spurs (2021)
After going undrafted in the 2020 NBA draft, on December 11, 2020, Kelley was reported to had signed with the San Antonio Spurs and subsequently waived by the San Antonio Spurs. Kelley was included in the roster of Austin Spurs.

London Lions (2021–2022)
On July 21, 2021, Kelley signed with the London Lions for the 2021–22 BBL season.

Bakken Bears (2022)
Since 2022, he has been with Bakken Bears of the Champions League and the Danish Basketligaen.

Return to Austin (2022–2023)
On December 20, 2022, Kelley was reacquired by the Austin Spurs.

Raptors 905 (2023–present)
On January 5, 2023, Kelley was acquired by the Raptors 905.

Personal life
Kelley's father, Jeff, played college basketball for Boise State. His mother, Shandel Howell, had intended to play the same sport for Utah State before its women's program was cut by the university.

References

External links
Oregon State Beavers bio
Northwest Christian Beacons bio

1997 births
Living people
American expatriate basketball people in Canada
American expatriate basketball people in Denmark
American men's basketball players
Austin Spurs players
Bakken Bears players
Basketball players from Utah
Bushnell University alumni
Centers (basketball)
Lane Titans men's basketball players
London Lions (basketball) players
Oregon State Beavers men's basketball players
Raptors 905 players
Sportspeople from Logan, Utah